NGC 3464 is a barred spiral galaxy in the constellation of Hydra, discovered 14 January 1886 by Ormond Stone.

Supernovae
Two supernovae were observed in NGC 3464 in 2002. SN 2002J, a Type Ic supernova, was detected 21 January, and SN 2002hy, a Type Ib supernova, was detected 12 November. A Type Ia supernova, SN 2015H, was first observed 10 February 2015.

References

External links
 

Barred spiral galaxies
Hydra (constellation)
3464
32778
Discoveries by Ormond Stone